Albania competed at the 2014 Summer Youth Olympics, in Nanjing, China from 16 August to 28 August 2014.

Athletics

Albania qualified two athletes.

Qualification Legend: Q=Final A (medal); qB=Final B (non-medal); qC=Final C (non-medal); qD=Final D (non-medal); qE=Final E (non-medal)

Boys
Field Events

Girls
Track & road events

Cycling

Albania qualified a boys' team based on its ranking issued by the UCI.

Team

Mixed relay

Swimming

Albania qualified one swimmer.

Girls

References

2014 in Albanian sport
Nations at the 2014 Summer Youth Olympics
Albania at the Youth Olympics